Beka Gorgadze (born 8 February 1996) is a Georgian rugby union player. His position is flanker, and he currently plays for Pau in the Top 14 and the Georgia national team.

Biography
Gorgadze plays in the squad of the club Stade montois from 2015. On December 11, 2015, he played his first Pro D2 match against Carcassonne, at the age of 19. He then became champion of France espoirs elite 2 at the end of the 2015-2016 season.

Being among the most promising players of Pro D2, the Union Bordeaux Bègles makes him sign a two-year contract starting from the 2018-2019 season.

International career
In 2019 Gorgadze was selected with Georgia to compete in the World Cup in Japan where he became the number 8 starter of his selection.

References

Rugby union players from Georgia (country)
Living people
1996 births
Georgia international rugby union players
Rugby union flankers